The Turtles are an American rock band formed in Los Angeles, California in 1965, best known for the 1967 hit song "Happy Together". They charted several other top 40 hits, including "It Ain't Me Babe" (1965), "You Baby" (1966), "She'd Rather Be With Me" (1967), "Elenore" (1968) and "You Showed Me" (1969).

As the Turtles' commercial success waned by the end of the 1960s, they became plagued with management issues, lawsuits and conflicts with their label, White Whale Records, leading the group to break up in 1970. Kaylan and Volman later found long-lasting success as session musicians and reunited in 1983 under the name Flo & Eddie, a comedy rock act. In 2010, a reconstituted version of the band, the Turtles featuring Flo & Eddie, began performing live shows again.

History

1963–1966: Formation, initial success and first personnel changes

The Nightriders, the Crossfires and the Tyrtles 
In early 1963, New Yorker Howard Kaylan and Californian Mark Volman attended the same school, Westchester High in Los Angeles (Kaylan had moved from New York City as a child). The two sang in the school's a cappella choir, where Volman soon heard about Kaylan's instrumental surf music band, the Nightriders (which included Kaylan on saxophone and choir members Al Nichol on lead guitar, Don Murray on drums and Chuck Portz on bass). Volman joined the group as a saxophonist, just before the group changed name in the Crossfires in the same year. After high school graduation, the band continued on while its members attended area colleges (picking up rhythm guitarist Jim Tucker along the way). 

They released a single, "Dr. Jekyll & Mr. Hyde" b/w "Fiberglass Jungle", on the local "Capco Records" label, always in 1963. With the help of KRLA and KFWB DJ and club owner Reb Foster, the Crossfires signed to the newly formed White Whale Records. Adhering to the prevailing musical trend, the group rebranded itself as a folk rock band under the name the Tyrtles, an intentionally stylized misspelling inspired by the Byrds and the Beatles. However, the trendy spelling did not survive long, and they finally had to name themselves the Turtles.

Because of the stylistic change from "Surf music" to "Folk rock", Kaylan and Volman dropped the saxophones to become the band's vocalists. Kaylan became the group's lead singer, and keyboardist (although he would give up most of the keyboard parts to Nichol in their hits). Volman began to harmonize with Kaylan's lead singing becoming a third guitarist, as well as a percussionist, for the band.

"It Ain't Me Babe" and You Baby 
As with the Byrds, the Turtles achieved breakthrough success with a cover of a Bob Dylan song. "It Ain't Me Babe" reached the Billboard Top Ten in the late summer of 1965, and was the title track of the band's first album. Their second single, "Let Me Be", reached the top 30, while their third hit, "You Baby", charted in the top 20 in early 1966. "You Baby", with its intricate vocal harmonies and upbeat tempo, would prove to be influential in the band's sound, as it saw them departing from the political Byrds-type folk rock; the band's new sound ranged from chamber pop to straightforward pop music.

The band's second album, You Baby, failed to reach Billboards Top LPs chart, and of several singles released in 1966, "Grim Reaper of Love" and "Can I Get to Know You Better" barely entered the Billboard Hot 100. One single, the tough "Outside Chance", written by Warren Zevon and featuring guitar work in the style of the Beatles' "Taxman", did not chart. In 1966, the Turtles made an appearance in Universal's beach party spy spoof film Out of Sight, singing "She'll Come Back" on screen.

At the start of 1966, drummer Don Murray and bassist Chuck Portz quit the group. They were replaced by Joel Larson and then John Barbata on drums, and by Chip Douglas on bass (October 1966).

1966–1968: Peak years

"Happy Together" 
The first of several key Turtles singles co-written by Garry Bonner and Alan Gordon, "Happy Together" had already been rejected by countless performers. "Happy Together", both their biggest hit and their signature song, signaled a turning point for both the Turtles and for Chip Douglas, who provided the arrangement. The single replaced the Beatles' "Penny Lane" at number one on the Billboard Hot 100 in the spring of 1967. The Turtles' only No. 1 remained there for three weeks. An album of the same name followed and peaked at No. 25. "Happy Together" reached No. 12 on the UK Singles Chart. This same year saw the Turtles performing the title song (composed by John Williams with lyrics by Leslie Bricusse) for the Twentieth Century-Fox bedroom farce A Guide for the Married Man.

Impressed by Chip Douglas's studio arrangements, Michael Nesmith approached him after a Turtles show at the Whisky a Go Go and invited him to become the Monkees' new producer, as that band wanted to break out of their "manufactured" studio mold. Douglas accepted and left the Turtles, ultimately producing three Monkees albums: Headquarters; Pisces, Aquarius, Capricorn & Jones Ltd. (both 1967) and co-produced The Birds, the Bees & the Monkees (1968). Douglas was replaced by Jim Pons on bass.

"She'd Rather Be with Me", "You Know What I Mean" and "She's My Girl" 
Other hits, all written by Gordon/Bonner, followed "Happy Together", turning the year of 1967 extremely lucrative for the Turtles. A follow-up, the brassy "She'd Rather Be with Me", reached No. 3 on the US charts in late spring and actually out-charted "Happy Together" overseas, reaching No. 4 in the UK. Two successive Top 15 songs followed: "You Know What I Mean" and "She's My Girl". Both 45s showed a psychedelic side in the band's style. Golden Hits was released later that year, charting in the top 10. The similar album covers for The Turtles! Golden Hits and its follow up More Golden Hits were designed by Dean Torrence of Jan & Dean.

In 1967, rhythm guitarist Jim Tucker left the band citing the pressure of touring and recording new material. He moved to Grass Valley where he became an electrical contractor. He has denied that he left the band because John Lennon was rude to him as suggested by singer Kaylan.

The Turtles Present the Battle of the Bands 
The first two singles in 1968, "Sound Asleep" and "The Story of Rock and Roll", stalled somewhere in the middle of the top 100. The band's fortunes changed when Chip Douglas returned to work with them in the studio. Late in 1968 the band released a concept album called The Turtles Present the Battle of the Bands, in which the group pretended to be 11 different bands (with fanciful names including the Bigg Brothers, Nature's Children, the US Teens featuring Raoul, and the Fabulous Dawgs), each with a song in a different genre. The album yielded two singles: "Elenore" and "You Showed Me" (both peaking at No. 6). "Elenore" also reached No. 7 in the UK chart. Although both singles were successful, they didn't help to boost the album's sales, which only peaked at No.128 on the Billboard Pop Albums. The 1969 hit "You Showed Me" had been written by the Byrds' Gene Clark and Roger (then Jim) McGuinn in 1964. It was their last top 10 single. Television appearances included a February 1968 spot on The Mike Douglas Show, to which they returned in April 1969.

1969–1970: Commercial waning and break-up

Turtle Soup 
Towards the end of 1969, the group released its next album, Turtle Soup, a critically well-received LP produced by Ray Davies of the Kinks. Inspired by the revered 1968 concept album The Kinks Are the Village Green Preservation Society, this was Davies's only released production work for another band (although Davies had previously produced demo recordings for the Iveys). Notable tracks include "Somewhere Friday Nite" and "Love in the City". In spite of Turtle Soups positive reception from the music press, its commercial success was marginal and the band soon began to disintegrate.

Conflicts with White Whale and disintegration 
Long disillusioned with their record label and its growing financial problems by this time, Kaylan and Volman resisted White Whale's efforts to turn the Turtles into something approaching an assembly-line pop act, like the early Monkees. The label apparently encouraged Kaylan and Volman to fire the rest of the band, tour with hired musicians and make records by adding their vocals to backing tracks recorded by Memphis session players. Such pressure convinced the band to record a single called "Who Would Ever Think That I Would Ever Marry Margaret?", which they disowned after its release.

The Turtles wound down their career in 1970 with a second compilation album, More Golden Hits, and a B-sides and rarities album, Wooden Head. With the demise of the Turtles, White Whale Records lost its biggest moneymaker and then was left with few commercially viable bands, and soon ceased operation.

Post-Turtles

1970s
Kaylan and Volman (accompanied by Chip Douglas' replacement, bassist Jim Pons) joined the Mothers of Invention as the Phlorescent Leech & Eddie, since the use of the Turtles name (and even their own names in billings) was prohibited by their contract with their label White Whale Records. Flo & Eddie, as they soon became known, recorded albums with Frank Zappa's band, appeared in Zappa's film 200 Motels in 1971, and later released a series of records on their own.

Kaylan and Volman sang backing vocals on several recordings by the band T. Rex, including their worldwide 1971 hit "Get it On (Bang A Gong)" and the albums Electric Warrior and The Slider. When White Whale's master recordings were sold at auction in 1974, the duo won the Turtles' masters, making them the owners of their own recorded work. They promptly licensed the tracks to Sire Records, who issued them as a compilation called "Happy Together Again". In the mid-1970s, Kaylan and Volman started their own syndicated radio show called Flo & Eddie by the Fireside, which originated from KMET in Los Angeles.

1980s
In the 1980s, the duo began hosting their own radio show on KROQ-FM in Los Angeles and WXRK in New York City and recorded soundtrack music for children's shows like the Care Bears and Strawberry Shortcake. In 1980, Flo and Eddie performed backing vocals on Alice Cooper's Flush the Fashion album, and sang backup on Bruce Springsteen's "Hungry Heart", from his album The River. 1982 saw the re-release of the Turtles' original albums through Rhino Records. 

In 1983 they also contributed backing vocals to the self-titled debut album of British New wave band Espionage, produced by Roy Thomas Baker and released by A&M Records. Also in 1983, Howard Kaylan appeared in the Rock and roll comedy film Get Crazy, starring Malcolm McDowell and Daniel Stern: Kaylan played the part of Captain Cloud, a spiritual guru, leader of a caravan of time-lost hippies. In the same year, Kaylan and Volman legally regained the use of "the Turtles" name and began touring as the Turtles... Featuring Flo and Eddie: instead of trying to reunite with their earlier bandmates, they began featuring all-star sidemen who had played with different groups. In 1984, the Turtles embarked on a U.S. "Happy Together" tour with Gary Puckett & the Union Gap, Spanky & Our Gang and the Association. 

In 1987, Kaylan and Volman appeared in a new music video of their 1967 song Happy Together to promote the romantic comedy Making Mr. Right, starring John Malkovich. That year also saw the debut of the previously unreleased Shell Shock album, as well as a new retrospective CD, 20 Greatest Hits, both released by Rhino. The latter compilation was followed up in 1988 with another, Turtle Wax: The Best of the Turtles, Vol. 2, which featured the best of their "album tracks" and previously-neglected single B-sides. 

The 1989 debut album by hip hop combo De La Soul, featured an uncredited sample from the Turtles (specifically, the intro to "You Showed Me"), in the song "Transmitting Live from Mars". Kaylan and Volman sued, winning a large settlement, setting a legal precedent, and causing the music industry to begin carefully crediting (and paying royalties for) sampled works on future rap music and other recordings in general. As they explained, "We don't hate sampling; we like sampling. If we don't get credit, we sue, and all that stuff (a share of the royalties, plus punitive damages) comes back to us!". It was incorrectly reported in 2009 that Volman was involved in another lawsuit against rapper Gucci Mane for an unauthorized sample; the sample of "Keep It Warm" used in Mane's "Lemonade" was cleared legitimately prior to the release of the song. Also in 1989, the Turtles' recording of Happy Together was featured in the eponymous romantic comedy film Happy Together, starring Patrick Dempsey and Helen Slater, as well as in the film soundtrack album.

1990s
In 1991 "Music Club Records" released a Turtles' anthology in the United Kingdom: Happy Together: The Best of the Turtles. In 1993 Repertoire Records in Germany released their own compilation, titled Elenore, as well as re-releasing the original Happy Together album. In the same year, Rhino Records also presented Captured Live, a live album of their 1992 tour. In 1994 Sundazed Records re-released all of the Turtles' original albums, and in 1999 Varèse Sarabande released Happy Together: The Best of White Whale Records, which included many of the Turtles' singles.

Original drummer Don Murray (born "Donald Ray Murray" on November 8, 1945) died on March 22, 1996 at age 50.

2000s
In 2002, the film Adaptation used their song "Happy Together" extensively as a device to portray the closeness of the two brothers Kaufman, both played by Nicolas Cage: this film closes with the Turtles' version over the final credit scroll and time lapse photography. 

Also the 2005 film Imagine Me & You, the title of which was taken from the first line of the song "Happy Together", used this song in its end credits. In 2009, a new Turtles compilation CD titled Save the Turtles: The Turtles Greatest Hits was issued on their own "FloEdCo Records" label and distributed by Manifesto Records.

2010s
Starting in the summer of 2010, "the Turtles... Featuring Flo & Eddie" toured throughout the United States as part of the "Happy Together: 25th Anniversary Tour", an oldies concert series that retained the "Happy Together" moniker in subsequent years. They performed alongside other 1960s and 1970s pop stars including Gary Puckett, Mitch Ryder, Mark Lindsay, Mark Farner, Gary Lewis, and Micky Dolenz. The 2015 tour featured the Buckinghams, the Cowsills, the Grass Roots, and the Association. In 2016, the complete output of the Turtles was reissued as two box sets, The Complete Original Album Collection and All the Singles. The expanded editions of the six albums contained in the former were also issued separately in 2017.

In 2018, since Kaylan required heart and back surgery, he was prohibited by his doctors from joining the tour, so Ron Dante (himself a prolific session musician of the Archies, the Cuff Links and the Detergents fame) stood in for him through the summer of 2021.

Original rhythm guitarist Jim Tucker (born "James Roy Tucker" on October 17, 1946) died on November 12, 2020, at age 74.

While the "Happy Together" tour resumed in 2022, Kaylan is still not performing with the group. Instead, Dante, who is not an original member, is performing as a member of "the Turtles" with original member Mark Volman.

Personnel 
Original line-up
 Howard Kaylan – lead vocals; keyboards 
 Mark Volman – harmony and backing vocals; guitar, percussion 
 Al Nichol – lead guitar, keyboards, backing vocals 
 Jim Tucker – rhythm and acoustic guitars; backing vocals 
 Chuck Portz – bass guitar 
 Don Murray – drums 
 Peter Whitmer - drums 
 Chip Douglas - bass guitar; backing vocals 
 Jim Pons - bass guitar; backing vocals 
 Joel Larson – drums 
 John Barbata – drums, percussion 
 Ran Whitehead – drums, percussion 
 John Seiter – drums

Timeline

Discography

 It Ain't Me Babe (1965)
 You Baby (1966)
 Happy Together (1967)
 The Turtles Present the Battle of the Bands (1968)
 Turtle Soup (1969)

See also

References

External links
 

 
Folk rock groups from California
American pop music groups
Musical groups established in 1965
Musical groups disestablished in 1970
Musical groups reestablished in 2010
Musical groups from Los Angeles
White Whale Records artists
1965 establishments in California